Andrew Simpson may refer to:

 Andrew Simpson (actor) (born 1989), Irish actor
 Andrew Simpson (sailor) (1976–2013), British sailor
 Andrew Simpson (animal trainer) (born 1966/1967), Scottish animal trainer
 Andrew Clive Simpson (born ), British computer scientist
 Andrew Simpson (Neighbours), a fictional character from the soap opera Neighbours